Zac Fisher (born 15 June 1998) is a professional Australian rules footballer playing for the Carlton Football Club in the Australian Football League (AFL). He was drafted by the Carlton Football Club with their second selection and twenty-seventh overall in the 2016 national draft. He made his debut in the twenty-six point loss against  at Etihad Stadium in round four of the 2017 season.

He was born in the Western Australian town of York, where his parents met. His father played more than 250 games for the local football club and his mother, who is Māori, came to Australia from New Zealand when she was twelve. He attended high school in Perth at Guildford Grammar School. During the 2016 Under-18 Championships, Fisher averaged 21 disposals, three marks and five tackles over his four games. These performances gained him selection in the All Australian Team as well as the Western Australian Most Valuable Player Award.

Western Australian Talent Manager Adam Jones commented on Fisher's ability prior to the 2016 National Draft, saying, "He's a terrific kid. He's high energy, really enthusiastic and a really good person to have in your team. He brings guys together. He's an exceptionally smart player and really sharp around the stoppages. He's a natural reader of the play, clean with his hands and quite skilful. He's played a lot of league footy this year and did really well for a kid his size. As he steps up he'll have to put on some size and improve his fitness, but he's had a terrific year and he's only going to get better."

In a match against  in 2018, Fisher suffered a broken leg after he was tripped by Daniel Howe in the first quarter. Howe was sent straight to the judiciary where he copped a three-game suspension for the incident.

In his second season, Fisher who played 17 games, averaged 19 disposals and 4 tackles while kicking 8 goals. Due to key injuries to midfield duo Marc Murphy and Matthew Kennedy, Fisher was afforded more opportunities in the midfield and relished his role playing alongside Patrick Cripps.

Statistics
Statistics are correct to the end of round 1, 2020

|- style="background-color: #EAEAEA"
! scope="row" style="text-align:center" | 2017
|style="text-align:center;"|
| 25 || 17 || 4 || 4 || 93 || 104 || 197 || 22 || 50 || 0.2 || 0.2 || 5.5 || 6.1 || 11.6 || 1.3 || 2.9
|-
! scope="row" style="text-align:center" | 2018
|style="text-align:center;"| 
| 25 || 17 || 8 || 6 || 170 || 156 || 326 || 29 || 59 || 0.5 || 0.4 || 10.0 || 9.2 || 19.2 || 1.7 || 3.5 
|- style="background-color: #EAEAEA"
! scope="row" style="text-align:center" | 2019
|style="text-align:center;"|
| 25 || 21 || 9 || 7 || 190 || 178 || 368 || 49 || 58 || 0.4 || 0.3 || 9.0 || 8.5 || 17.5 || 2.3 || 2.8 
|-
! scope="row" style="text-align:center" | 2020
|style="text-align:center;"|
| 25 || 8 || 6 || 2 || 57 || 50 || 107 || 13 || 20 || 0.8 || 0.3 || 7.1 || 6.3 || 13.4 || 1.6 || 2.5 
|- class="sortbottom"
! colspan=3| Career
! 63
! 27
! 19
! 510
! 488
! 998
! 113
! 187
! 0.4
! 0.3
! 8.1
! 7.8
! 15.8
! 1.8
! 3.0
|}

References

External links

1998 births
Living people
Carlton Football Club players
Perth Football Club players
Australian rules footballers from Western Australia
People from York, Western Australia
Australian people of Māori descent
People educated at Guildford Grammar School